Nermin Hadžiahmetović (born 15 October 1953) is a Bosnian former football manager.

He led Čelik Zenica to the first ever Bosnian league title in the 1994–95 season. Hadžiahmetović won one more league title with Čelik in 1996, and one with Sarajevo in 1999.

Honours

Manager
Čelik Zenica 
First League of Bosnia and Herzegovina: 1994–95, 1995–96
Bosnian Cup: 1994–95, 1995–96

Sarajevo 
First League of Bosnia and Herzegovina: 1998–99
Bosnian Cup: 1996–97

References

External links
Nermin Hadžiahmetović at Eurosport

1953 births
Living people
Sportspeople from Zenica
Bosniaks of Bosnia and Herzegovina
Bosnia and Herzegovina football managers
NK Čelik Zenica managers
Bosnia and Herzegovina national under-21 football team managers
FK Sarajevo managers
NK Primorje managers
FK Olimpik managers
FK Sloboda Tuzla managers
Manama Club managers
Expatriate football managers in Slovenia
Expatriate football managers in Bahrain
Premier League of Bosnia and Herzegovina managers